Honuba Şıxlar (also, Honuba-Şıxlar, Gonoba-Shikhlyar, and Khonuba Shykhlyar) is a village and municipality in the Yardymli Rayon of Azerbaijan.  It has a population of 458.  The municipality consists of the villages of Honuba Şıxlar and Zeynələzir.

References 

Populated places in Yardimli District